Kevin Gage is the name of:
Kevin Gage (actor) (born 1959), American actor
Kevin Gage (footballer) (born 1964), British footballer